Braman may refer to:

 Brahman, Hindu concept of The Supreme Reality
 Braman, Oklahoma
 Bra Man, a fictional "superhero" from the webcomic Least I Could Do
 Braman, a robot created by Brains (Thunderbirds) from the 1965 Thunderbirds episode called "Sun Probe"
 Bryan Braman (born 1987), American football linebacker for the Philadelphia Eagles
 John Braman (1627–1703), English politician
 James d'Orma Braman (1901–1980), former mayor of Seattle, Washington
 Norman Braman (born 1932), American auto dealer and former owner of the Philadelphia Eagles
 Waters W. Braman (1840–1893), New York politician